Enrique Alférez (1901–1999) was a Mexican artist who specialized in sculpting architectural reliefs and the human form.

Early life and education 
Born in a rural village in northern Mexico, Alférez was introduced to sculpture by his father, a woodworker who was trained . He ran away at age 12, and was conscripted into the Constitutional Army during the Mexican Revolution. In 1920, he fled his home country and made his way to El Paso, Texas, where he found work as a photographer's assistant. It was here he attended a lecture presented by art teacher Lorado Taft, who was visiting El Paso on an Art Institute of Chicago tour. Seeing potential in the young man, Taft encouraged Alferez to come study under him in Chicago, which he did from 1927 through 1929.

Career 
After completing his education in 1929, he moved to New Orleans, Louisiana, where he spent much of the rest of his life. He later married an American woman named Margaret, with whom he had a daughter.

His sculptures and reliefs adorn many parks, buildings, and landmarks in the New Orleans Metropolitan Area, many of them commissioned by the Works Progress Administration. Some of the most notable include those in City Park, as well as the "Molly Marine" statue, the first American sculpture to depict a woman in military uniform. His fountain at New Orleans Lakefront Airport is a well known local landmark.  He made reliefs for a number of buildings, including the Charity Hospital Building in New Orleans and the Palmolive Building in Chicago.

Alférez was not only a sculptor, and actively produced work in other artistic disciplines. Notably, he painted an official portrait of Senator Huey P. Long (who he personally loathed, as he revealed decades later).

Alférez remained active into his later years, both as a working artist and an art teacher.  In 1993, he appeared in a PBS American Experience documentary entitled "The Hunt for Pancho Villa".

External links 
 Enrique Alferez in The Hunt For Pancho Villa

References

1901 births
1999 deaths
Artists from New Orleans
School of the Art Institute of Chicago alumni
Mexican sculptors
Male sculptors
Works Progress Administration workers
20th-century American sculptors
20th-century Mexican male artists
Mexican-American culture
American male sculptors
Artists from Zacatecas
Art Deco artists
20th-century American male artists